Mount Hanson is a mountain rising to , standing  southeast of Supporting Party Mountain in the Harold Byrd Mountains of Antarctica. It was discovered in December 1929 by the Byrd Antarctic Expedition geological party under Laurence Gould, and named by Rear Admiral Richard E. Byrd for Malcolm P. Hanson, chief radio engineer of the expedition, and a pioneer in the development of radio communication apparatus for polar regions.

References

Mountains of Marie Byrd Land